Kharrat Kola may refer to:
 Kharrat Kola, Babol
 Kharrat Kola, Simorgh